Dobroslava Menclová (née Vavroušková; 2 January 1904, Přerov – 19 November 1978, Sušice) was a Czech art historian and architect. She is best remembered for her two volume study on Czech castles titled České hrady (1972 and 1976).

References

1904 births
1978 deaths
People from Přerov
Czech art historians
Czech architects